Warning was a French hard-rock band active from 1980 until 1985. They released three albums sung in French language, their second being produced by Dieter Dierks.

Discography
 Warning I, Polydor 1981, CD re-issue by Axe Killer, gold certification in France
 Warning II, Polydor 1982, CD re-issue by Axe Killer, gold certification in France
 Metamorphose, Columbia 1984

Musicians
 Raphael Garrido : vocals on Warning I and Warning II
 Francis Petit : vocals on Metamorphose
 Christophe Aubert : guitars, died in a car crash in 1994
 Didier Bernoussi : guitars on Warning I and Warning II, died in 2011
 Michel Aymé : bass on Warning II and Metamorphose
 Gerald Manceau : drums on Warning II and Metamorphose

External links
 Warning french website
 France Metal Museum

French hard rock musical groups
Musical groups from Paris